John Sigismund (8 November 1572 – 23 December 1619) was a Prince-elector of the Margraviate of Brandenburg from the House of Hohenzollern. He became the Duke of Prussia through his marriage to Duchess Anna, the eldest daughter of Duke Albert Frederick of Prussia who died without sons. Their marriage resulted in the potential creation of Brandenburg-Prussia, which became a reality after Poland's leader appointed John Sigismund in charge of Prussia in regency and, shortly thereafter, Albert Frederick died without an able, direct male heir.

Elector of Brandenburg and Duke of Prussia
John Sigismund was born in Halle an der Saale to Joachim III Frederick, Elector of Brandenburg, and his first wife Catherine of Brandenburg-Küstrin. He succeeded his father as Margrave of Brandenburg in 1608. In 1611, John Sigismund traveled from Königsberg to Warsaw, where on 16 November 1611 he gave feudal homage to Sigismund III Vasa, King of Poland (the Duchy of Prussia was a Polish fief at the time). He officially became Duke of Prussia in 1618, although he had served as regent on behalf of the mentally-disturbed Albert Frederick, Duke of Prussia, for several years prior. He suffered a stroke in 1616 from which he didn't recover and died in 1619.

John Sigismund gave the Reichshof Castrop to his teacher and educator Carl Friedrich von Bordelius, whereas he received the territories of Cleves, Mark, and Ravensberg in the Treaty of Xanten in 1614.

Religious policy
John Sigismund's most significant action was his conversion from Lutheranism to Calvinism, after he had earlier equalized the rights of Catholics and Protestants in the Duchy of Prussia under pressure from the King of Poland. He was probably won over to Calvinism during a visit to Heidelberg in 1606, but it was not until 25 December 1613 that he publicly took communion according to the Calvinist rite. The vast majority of his subjects in Brandenburg, including his wife Anna of Prussia, remained deeply Lutheran, however. After the Elector and his Calvinist court officials drew up plans for mass conversion of the population to the new faith in February 1614, as provided for by the rule of Cuius regio, eius religio within the Holy Roman Empire, there were serious protests, with his wife backing the Lutherans. Resistance was so strong that in 1615, John Sigismund backed down and relinquished all attempts at forcible conversion. Instead, he allowed his subjects to be either Lutheran or Calvinist according to the dictates of their own consciences. Henceforward, Brandenburg-Prussia would be a bi-confessional state.

Family and children
On 30 October 1594, John Sigismund married Anna of Prussia, daughter of Albert Frederick, Duke of Prussia (1553–1618). She was the elder sister of his stepmother. They were parents to eight children:

 George William of Brandenburg (13 November 1595 – 1 December 1640). His successor.
 Anne Sophia of Brandenburg (15 March 1598 – 19 December 1659). Married Frederick Ulrich, Duke of Brunswick-Lüneburg.
 Maria Eleonora of Brandenburg (11 November 1599 – 28 March 1655). Married Gustavus Adolphus of Sweden. They were parents of Christina of Sweden.
 Catherine of Brandenburg (28 May 1602 – 27 August 1644). Married first Gabriel Bethlen, Prince of Transylvania and secondly Franz Karl of Saxe-Lauenburg.
 Joachim Sigismund of Brandenburg (25 July 1603 – 22 February 1625).
 Agnes of Brandenburg (31 August 1606 – 12 March 1607).
 John Frederick of Brandenburg (18 August 1607 – 1 March 1608).
 Albrecht Christian of Brandenburg (7–14 March 1609).

Ancestry

References

External links

 
 Settlement of Dortmund between Brandenburg and Palatinate-Neuburg and the conflict of succession in Jülich, in full text

1572 births
1619 deaths
17th-century Dukes of Prussia
People from Halle (Saale)
Prince-electors of Brandenburg
House of Hohenzollern
German Calvinist and Reformed Christians
Dukes of Prussia
Electoral Princes of Brandenburg
John Sigismund
Burials at Berlin Cathedral